L-838,417 is an anxiolytic drug used in scientific research. It has similar effects to benzodiazepine drugs, but is structurally distinct and so is classed as a nonbenzodiazepine anxiolytic. The compound was developed by Merck, Sharp and Dohme.

L-838,417 is a subtype-selective GABAA positive allosteric modulator, acting as a partial agonist at α2, α3 and α5 subtypes. However, it acts as a negative allosteric modulator at the α1 subtype, and has little affinity for the α4 or α6 subtypes. This gives it selective anxiolytic effects, which are mediated mainly by α2 and α3 subtypes, but with little sedative or amnestic effects as these effects are mediated by α1. Some sedation might still be expected due to its activity at the α5 subtype, which can also cause sedation, however no sedative effects were seen in animal studies even at high doses, suggesting that L-838,417 is primarily acting at α2 and α3 subtypes with the α5 subtype of lesser importance.

As might be predicted from its binding profile, L-838,417 substitutes for the anxiolytic benzodiazepine chlordiazepoxide in animals, but not for the hypnotic imidazopyridine drug zolpidem. 
The synthesis of L-838,417 and similar compounds was described in 2005 in the Journal of Medicinal Chemistry.

In neuropathic pain animal models, it has been shown that stabilizing the Potassium Chloride Cotranspoter 2 (KCC2) at neuronal membranes could not only potentiate the L-838,417-induced analgesia in rats, but also rescue its analgesic potential at high doses, revealing a novel strategy for analgesia in pathological pain, by combined targeting of the appropriate GABAA receptor subtypes (i.e. α2, α3) and restoring Cl− homeostasis.

See also 
 α5IA
 SL-651,498

References 

Anxiolytics
Fluoroarenes
Triazolopyridazines
Ethers
Triazoles
GABAA receptor positive allosteric modulators
Tert-butyl compounds